In the field of sociology, cultural capital comprises the social assets of a person (education, intellect, style of speech, style of dress, etc.) that promote social mobility in a stratified society. Cultural capital functions as a social relation within an economy of practices (i.e. system of exchange), and includes the accumulated cultural knowledge that confers social status and power; thus cultural capital comprises the material and symbolic goods, without distinction, that society considers rare and worth seeking. There are three types of cultural capital: (i) embodied capital, (ii) objectified capital, and (iii) institutionalised capital.

Pierre Bourdieu and Jean-Claude Passeron coined and defined the term cultural capital in the essay "Cultural Reproduction and Social Reproduction" (1977). Bourdieu then developed the concept in the essay "The Forms of Capital" (1985) and in the book The State Nobility: Élite Schools in the Field of Power (1996) to explain that the education (knowledge and intellectual skills) of a person provides social mobility in achieving a higher social status in society.

Origin 
In "Cultural Reproduction and Social Reproduction" (1977), Pierre Bourdieu and Jean-Claude Passeron presented cultural capital to conceptually explain the differences among the levels of performance and academic achievement of children within the educational system of France in the 1960s.

Bourdieu further developed the concept in his essay "The Forms of Capital" (1985) and in his book The State Nobility: Élite Schools in the Field of Power (1996). In the essay, Bourdieu lists cultural capital among two other categories of capital: economic capital, which refers to the command of economic resources (money, assets, property); and social capital, which is the actual and potential resources linked to the possession of a durable network of institutionalized relationships of mutual acquaintance and recognition.

Types

There are three types of cultural capital: embodied capital; objectified capital; and institutionalised capital.

Embodied cultural capital 
Embodied cultural capital comprises the knowledge that is consciously acquired and passively inherited, by socialization to culture and tradition. Unlike property, cultural capital is not transmissible, but is acquired over time, as it is impressed upon the person's habitus (i.e., character and way of thinking), which, in turn, becomes more receptive to similar cultural influences. Linguistic cultural capital is the mastery of language and its relations. The embodied cultural capital, which is a person's means of communication and self-presentation, is acquired from the national culture.

Habitus and field
The cultural capital of an individual is linked to his or her habitus (i.e., embodied disposition and tendencies) and field (i.e., social positions), which are configured as a social-relation structure.

The habitus of a person is composed of the intellectual dispositions inculcated to him or her by family and the familial environment, and are manifested according to the nature of the person. As such, the social formation of a person's habitus is influenced by family, by objective changes in social class, and by social interactions with other people in daily life; moreover, the habitus of a person also changes when he or she changes social positions within the field.

The field is the place of social position that is constituted by the conflicts that occur when social groups endeavour to establish and define what is cultural capital, within a given social space; therefore, depending upon the social field, one type of cultural capital can simultaneously be legitimate and illegitimate. In that way, the legitimization (societal recognition) of a type of cultural capital can be arbitrary and derived from symbolic capital.

Objectified cultural capital 
Objectified cultural capital comprises the person's property (e.g. a work of art, scientific instruments, etc.) that can be transmitted for economic profit (buying-and-selling) and for symbolically conveying the possession of cultural capital facilitated by owning such things. Yet, whilst possessing a work of art (objectified cultural-capital) the person can consume the art (understand its cultural meaning) only with the proper conceptual and historical foundations of prior cultural-capital. As such, cultural capital is not transmitted in the sale of the work of art, except by coincidental and independent causation, when the seller explains the artwork's significance to the buyer.

Institutionalized cultural capital 
Institutionalized cultural capital comprises an institution's formal recognition of a person's cultural capital, usually academic credentials or professional qualifications. The greatest social role of institutionalized cultural-capital is in the labor market (a job), wherein it allows the expression of the person's array of cultural capital as qualitative and quantitative measurements (which are compared against the measures of cultural capital of other people). The institutional recognition facilitates the conversion of cultural capital into economic capital, by serving as a heuristic (practical solution) with which the seller can describe his or her cultural capital to the buyer.

Theoretical research
The concept of cultural capital has received widespread attention all around the world, from theorists and researchers alike. It is mostly employed in relation to the education system, but on the odd occasion has been used or developed in other discourses. Use of Bourdieu's cultural capital can be broken up into a number of basic categories. First, are those who explore the theory as a possible means of explanation or employ it as the framework for their research. Second, are those who build on or expand Bourdieu's theory. Finally, there are those who attempt to disprove Bourdieu's findings or to discount them in favour of an alternative theory. The majority of these works deal with Bourdieu's theory in relation to education, only a small number apply his theory to other instances of inequality in society.

Expansion
A number of works expand Bourdieu's theory of cultural capital in a beneficial manner, without deviating from Bourdieu's framework of the different forms of capital. In fact, these authors can be seen to explore unarticulated areas of Bourdieu's theory as opposed to constructing a new theory.

One creative modification of Bourdieu's work is that of Emirbayer & Williams (2005), who use Bourdieu's notion of fields and capital to examine the power relations in the field of social services, particularly homeless shelters. The authors talk of the two separate fields that operate in the same geographic location (the shelter) and the types of capital that are legitimate and valued in each. Specifically they show how homeless people can possess "staff-sanctioned capital" or "client-sanctioned capital" and show how in the shelter, they are both at the same time, desirable and undesirable, valued and disparaged, depending on which of the two fields they are operating in. Although the authors do not clearly define staff-sanctioned and client-sanctioned capital as cultural capital, and state that usually the resources that form these two capitals are gathered from a person's life as opposed to their family, it can be seen how Bourdieu's theory of cultural capital can be a valuable theory in analysing inequality in any social setting.

On the other hand, some have introduced new variables into Bourdieu's concept of cultural capital. The work of Emmison & Frow (1998) centers on an exploration of the ability of Information Technology to be considered a form of cultural capital. The authors state that "a familiarity with, and a positive disposition towards the use of bourgeoisie technologies of the information age can be seen as an additional form of cultural capital bestowing advantage on those families that possess them." Specifically computers are "machines" that form a type of objectified cultural capital, and the ability to use them is an embodied type of cultural capital. This work is useful because it shows the ways in which Bourdieu's concept of cultural capital can be expanded and updated to include cultural goods and practices which are progressively more important in determining achievement both in the school and without.

Dolby (2000) cites the work of Hage, who uses Bourdieu's theory of cultural capital to explore multiculturalism and racism in Australia. Hage's discussion around race is distinct from Bourdieu's treatment of migrants and their amount of linguistic capital and habitus. Hage actually conceives of "whiteness" as being a form of cultural capital. 'White' is not a stable, biologically determined trait, but a "shifting set of social practices." He conceptualizes the nation as a circular field, with the hierarchy moving from the powerful center (composed of 'white' Australians) to the less powerful periphery (composed of the 'others'). The 'others' however are not simply dominated, but are forced to compete with each other for a place closer to the centre. This use of Bourdieu's notion of capital and fields is extremely illuminating to understand how people of non-Anglo ethnicities may try and exchange the cultural capital of their ethnic background with that of 'whiteness' to gain a higher position in the hierarchy. It is especially useful to see it in these terms as it exposes the arbitrary nature of what is "Australian", and how it is determined by those in the dominant position (mainly 'white' Australians). In a path-breaking study, Bauder (2006) uses the notions of habitus and cultural capital to explain the situation of migrants in the labor market and society.

Bourdieu's theory has been expanded to reflect modern forms of cultural capital.  For instance, studies conducted by Asaf Nissenbaum and Limor Shifman (2017) on the topic of internet memes, utilising the website 4chan to analyse how these memes can be seen as forms of cultural capital. Discourse demonstrates the different forums and mediums that memes can be expressed through, such as different 'boards' on 4chan. Additionally, scholars have extended Bourdieu's theory to the field of religion where embodied cultural capital allows middle classes for developing distinctive religious styles and tastes. Through these styles and tastes, they draw symbolic class boundaries in opposition to co-believers from lower-class backgrounds.

Education 
Sociologist Paul DiMaggio expands on Bourdieu's view on cultural capital and its influence on education: "Following Bourdieu, I measure high school students' cultural capital using self-reports of involvement in art, music, and literature."

Retired teacher John Taylor Gatto, in his article "Against School" (2003), addresses education in modern schooling. The relation of cultural capital can be linked to Alexander Inglis' Principles of Secondary Education (1918), which indicates how American schooling is similar to Prussian schooling in the 1820s. The objective was to divide children into sections, by distributing them by subject, by age, and by test score. Inglis introduces six basic functions for modern schooling; the third, fourth, and fifth basic functions listed by Inglis are related to cultural capital, and describe the manner in which schooling enforces the cultural capital of each child, from a young age:

 Diagnosis and direction (function #3):↵School is meant to determine the proper social role of each student, by logging mathematic and anecdotal evidence into cumulative records.
 Differentiation (function #4): Once the social role of a student is determined, the children are sorted by role and trained only as merited for his or her social destination.
 Selection (function #5): This refers to Darwin's theory of natural selection applied to "the favoured races".

The idea is to help American society by consciously attempting to improve the breeding stock. Schools are meant to tag the socially unfit with poor grades, remedial-schooling placement, and other notable social punishments that their peers will then view and accept them as intellectually inferior, and effectively bar them from the reproductive (sexual, economic, and cultural) sweepstakes of life. That was the purpose of petty humiliation in school: "It was the dirt down the drain." The three functions are directly related to cultural capital, because through schooling children are discriminated by social class and cognitively placed into the destination that will make them fit to sustain that social role. That is the path leading to their determined social class; and, during the fifth function, they will be socially undesirable to the privileged children, and so kept in a low social stratum.

Stanton-Salazar & Dornbusch (1995) examine how those people with the desired types of cultural (and linguistic) capital in a school transform this capital into "instrumental relations" or social capital with institutional agents who can transmit valuable resources to the person, furthering their success in the school. They state that this is simply an elaboration of Bourdieu's theory. Similarly, Dumais (2002) introduces the variable of gender to determine the ability of cultural capital to increase educational achievement. The author shows how gender and social class interact to produce different benefits from cultural capital. In fact in Distinction, Bourdieu states "sexual properties are as inseparable from class properties as the yellowness of lemons is inseparable from its acidity." He simply did not articulate the differences attributable to gender in his general theory of reproduction in the education system.

Cultural omnivores 
Extending the theory of cultural capital, Richard A. Peterson and A. Simkus (1992) distinguish the (secondary) analysis of survey data on Americans exclusively. They use the term cultural omnivores as a particular higher status section in the US that has broader cultural engagements and tastes spanning an eclectic range from highbrow arts to popular culture.

Originally, it was Peterson (1992) who coined the term to address an anomaly observed in the evidence revealed by his work with Simkus (1992), which showed that people of higher social status, contrary to elite-mass models of cultural taste developed by French scholars with French data, were not averse to participation in activities associated with popular culture. The work rejected the universal adaptation of the cultural capital theory, especially in the 20th century in advanced post-industrialist societies like the United States.

Science capital 
In the UK, Louise Archer and colleagues (2015) developed the concept of science capital. The concept of science capital draws from the work of Bourdieu, particularly his studies focusing on the reproduction of social inequalities in society. Science capital is made up of science-related cultural capital and social capital as well as habitus. It encapsulates the various influences that a young person's life experiences can have on their science identity and participation in science-related activities. The empirical work on science capital builds from a growing body of data into students' aspirations and attitudes to science, including University College London's ASPIRES Research and King's College London's Enterprising Science.

The concept of science capital was developed as a way to understand why these science-related resources, attitudes and aspirations led some children to pursue science, while others did not. The concept provides policy makers and practitioners with a useful framework to help understand what shapes young people's engagement with (and potential resistance to) science.

Criticism
Criticisms of Bourdieu's concept have been made on many grounds, including a lack of conceptual clarity. Perhaps due to this lack of clarity, researchers have operationalised the concept in diverse ways, and have varied in their conclusions. While some researchers may be criticised for using measures of cultural capital which focus only on certain aspects of 'highbrow' culture, this is a criticism which could also be leveled at Bourdieu's own work. Several studies have attempted to refine the measurement of cultural capital in order to examine which aspects of middle-class culture actually have value in the education system.

It has been claimed that Bourdieu's theory, and in particular his notion of habitus, is entirely deterministic, leaving no place for individual agency or even individual consciousness. However, Bourdieu never claimed to have done so entirely, but defined a new approach; that is, Bourdieu's work attempts to reconcile the paradoxical dichotomy of structure and agency.

Some scholars such as John Goldthorpe dismiss Bourdieu's approach:

Bourdieu has also been criticised for his lack of consideration of gender. Kanter (in Robinson & Garnier 1986) points out the lack of interest in gender inequalities in the labour market in Bourdieu's work. However, Bourdieu addressed the topic of gender head-on in his 2001 book Masculine Domination, in which he states on the first page of the prelude that he considers masculine domination to be a prime example of symbolic violence.

See also

Academic capital
Cultural economics
Cultural reproduction
Cultural studies
Culture change
Culture industry
Great British Class Survey
Human capital
Individual capital

References

Citations

Primary sources

Bourdieu, Pierre. [1985] 1986. "The Forms of Capital." Pp. 241–58 in Handbook for Theory and Research for the Sociology of Education, edited by J. G. Richardson.
First published: 1983 "Ökonomisches Kapital - Kulturelles Kapital - Soziales Kapital" (in German). Pp. 183–98 in Soziale Ungleichheiten, edited by R. Kreckel.
—— 1996. The State Nobility, translated by Lauretta C. Clough, with foreword by Loïc Wacquant.
2001. Masculine Domination. Stanford: Stanford University Press.
Bourdieu, Pierre, and Jean Claude Passeron. 1990. Reproduction in Education, Society and Culture. London: Sage Publications Inc

Secondary sources
Bauder, Harald. 2006. Labor Movement: How Migration Regulates Labor Markets. New York: Oxford University Press.
De Graaf, Nan Dirk, Paul M. De Graaf, and Gerbert Kraaykamp. 2000. "Parental Cultural Capital and Educational Attainment in the Netherlands: A Refinement of the Cultural Capital Perspective." Sociology of Education 73(2):92–111. . .
Dolby, N. 2000. "Race, National, State: Multiculturalism in Australia." Arena Magazine (45):48–51.
Dumais, Susan A. 2002. "Cultural Capital, Gender, and School Success: The Role of Habitus." Sociology of Education 75(1):44–68. . . .
Emirbayer, Mustafa, and Eva M. Williams. 2005. "Bourdieu and Social Work." Social Service Review 79(4):689–724. . .
Emmison, M., and J. Frow. 1998. "Information Technology as Cultural Capital." Australian Universities Review 1(1998):41-45.
Gorder, K. [1980] 2000. "Understanding School Knowledge: A Critical Appraisal of Basil Bernstein and Pierre Bourdieu." Pp. 218–33 in Pierre Bourdieu Volume II, edited by D. Robbins. London: Sage Publications.
Harker, R. 1990. "Education and Cultural Capital." In An Introduction to the Work of Pierre Bourdieu: The Practice of Theory, edited by R. Harker, C. Mahar, and C. Wilkes. London: Macmillan Press.
Kalmijn, Matthijs, and Gerbert Kraaykamp. 1996. "Race, Cultural Capital, and Schooling: An Analysis of Trends in the United States." Sociology of Education 69(1):22–34. . . .
King, A. 2005. "Structure and Agency." Pp. 215–32 in Modern Social Theory: An Introduction, edited by A. Harrington. Oxford: Oxford University Press.
Kingston, Paul W. 2001. "The Unfulfilled Promise of Cultural Capital Theory." Sociology of Education 74 (extra issue: "Current of Thought: Sociology of Education at the Dawn of the 21st Century"):88–99. . .
Koehrsen, J. 2018. "Religious Tastes and Styles as Markers of Class Belonging." Sociology 53(6):1237–53. .
Martin, B., and I. Szelenyi. [1987] 2000. "Beyond Cultural Capital: Toward a Theory of Symbolic Domination." Pp. 278–302 in Pierre Bourdieu Volume I, edited by D. Robbins. London: Sage Publications. 
Robbins, D. 1991. The Work of Pierre Bourdieu: Recognising Society. Buckingham: Open University Press.
Robinson, R., and M. Garnier. [1986] 2000. "Class Reproduction Among Men and Women in France: Reproduction Theory on its Home Ground." Pp. 144–53 in Pierre Bourdieu Volume I, edited by D. Robbins. London: Sage Publications.
Rössel, Jörg, and Claudia Beckert-Zieglschmid. 2002. "Die Reproduktion kulturellen Kapitals [The Reproduction of Cultural Capital]." Zeitschrift für Soziologie 31(6):497–513. . .
Stanton-Salazar, Ricardo D., and Sanford M. Dornbusch. 1995. "Social Capital and the Reproduction of Inequality: Information Networks among Mexican-Origin High School Students." Sociology of Education 68(2):116–35. . .
Sullivan, Alice. 2001. "Cultural Capital and Educational Attainment." Sociology 35(4):893–912. .
—— 2002. "Bourdieu and Education: How Useful is Bourdieu's Theory for Researchers?" Netherlands Journal of Social Sciences 38(2):144–66. . Archived from the original (PDF) on 2018-07-12.
Webb, J., T. Schirato, and G. Danaher. 2002. Understanding Bourdieu. London: Sage Publications.

Further reading
Brown, Richard K., ed. Cultural Reproduction and Social Reproduction Bourdieu and Passeron. In Knowledge, Education and Cultural Change. London: Tavistock.
Farkas, George. 1996. Human Capital Or Cultural Capital?: Ethnicity and Poverty Groups in an Urban School District. Aldine Transaction. 
Fowler, Bridget. 1997. Pierre Bourdieu and Cultural Theory. London: Sage Publications Inc. .
Swartz, David (1998), Culture and Power: The Sociology of Pierre Bourdieu,  University of Chicago Press 
"Les Trois états du capital culturel." Actes de la Recherche en Sciences Sociales 30(1979):3–6.

External links 

 HyperBourdieu World Catalogue — a "comprehensive, contextual and referential bibliography and mediagraphy of all works and public statements by Pierre Bourdieu," compiled by Ingo Mörth and Gerhard Fröhlich.

Capital (economics)
Cultural studies
Community building
Human resource management
Pierre Bourdieu
Capital